The 2011 SWAC men's basketball tournament took place March 9–12 at the Garland Special Events Center in Garland, Texas. The top eight teams in the conference standings qualified for the tournament.  Alabama State, the winner of the tournament, received the Southwestern Athletic Conference's automatic bid to the 2011 NCAA tournament. The tournament's championship game was televised on ESPNU.

Bracket

Asterisk denotes an overtime.

References

 
SWAC men's basketball tournament